Pleasure to Burn  may refer to:

 Pleasure to Burn (Burning Rain album), 2000
 Pleasure to Burn (Systematic album), 2003
 A Pleasure to Burn, a 2010 short-story collection by Ray Bradbury